Songs From Sun Street is the 1998 studio album release of the Irish rock band, The Saw Doctors.  The album was not only released on CD, but audio cassette and vinyl as well. It was released on The Saw Doctors' own record label, Shamtown Records as well as Paradigm Records.

Track listing
 "Good News" (Carton, Doherty, Moran, Stevens) – 3:04
 "Sugartown" (Carton, Moran, Stevens) – 3:13
 "Galway and Mayo" (Moran) – 3:33
 "Carry Me Away" (Carton, Moran) – 4:10
 "Heading for the Sunshine" (Carton, Moran) – 2:36
 "Catríona Tells Lies" (Carton, Doherty, Donnelly) – 2:37
 "Blah, Blah, Blah" (Carton, Doherty, Moran) – 2:35
 "D'Ya Wanna Hear My Guitar?" (Carton, Moran) – 2:50
 "Joyce Country Céilí Band" (Carton, Doherty, Moran) – 3:47
 "High Nellie" (Carton, Moran, Stevens) – 1:48
 "Best of Friends" (Doherty) – 2:35
 "Will It Ever Stop Raining?" (Carton, Doherty, Moran, Murray) – 2:48
 "Tommy K." (Carton, Moran, Stevens) – 2:43
 "Away With the Fairies" (Carton, Doherty, Moran) – 3:23
 "I'll Be on My Way" (Carton, Moran) – 3:06
 "Apples, Sweets or Chocolate" (hidden track from 7:58 to 11:40)

Band members
Davy Carton: Vocals, guitar, array mbira
Leo Moran: Vocals, guitar
Pearse Doherty: Vocals, bass
John Donnelly: Drums, vocals
Derek Murray: Keyboards, accordion, guitar

External links
The Saw Doctors Official Website

1998 albums
The Saw Doctors albums